Uri Dam is a 480 MW hydroelectric power station on the Jhelum River near Uri in Baramula district of the Jammu and Kashmir, India. It is located very near to the Line of Control, the de facto border between India and Pakistan. The station is largely built under a hill with a 10 km tunnel. It is of the run-of-the-river type without a large dam, since the Indus Waters Treaty gives Pakistan the exclusive right to regulate the Jhelum River. On 4 July 2014 a 240 MW Uri-II power project which is a new project located just downstream of Uri I, was inaugurated.

Construction 
The project was awarded by the National Hydroelectric Power Corporation in October 1989 to a European consortium called Uri Civil led by Swedish Skanska and including Swedish NCC and ABB and British Kvaerner Boving. It was partially funded by the Swedish and British governments. 
The workforce included about 200 foreigners and 4,000 Indians, many from the local area. This together with shelling across the border and unrest related to the burning of Charari Sharief and the siege of Hazratbal Shrine led to an 18-month delay.

The project cost about Rs. 33 billion (about 450 million EUR or US$660 million) and was completed in 1997.

Operation 
The station is operated by the NHPC. Plans to expand it with a 250 MW Uri-II plant were announced in 1998. The government of Pakistan has objected to this, saying it violates the Indus Waters Treaty. On 4 July 2014 a 240 MW Uri-II power project which is a new project located just downstream of Uri I, was inaugurated.

References

External links 

 Uri Hydroelectric Project on NHPC website.

Hydroelectric power stations in Jammu and Kashmir
Dams in Jammu and Kashmir
Dams on the Jhelum River
1997 establishments in Jammu and Kashmir
Dams completed in 1997
Uri, Jammu and Kashmir
20th-century architecture in India